Mar'it-ayin (Mish.: מַרְאִית הָעַיִן; Modern  'appearance to the eye'; Ashkenazic transliteration: maris ayin), is a concept in halakha (Jewish law) which states that certain actions which might  to observers to be in violation of Jewish law, but in reality are fully permissible, are themselves not allowed due to rabbinic enactments that were put in place to prevent onlookers from arriving at a false conclusion. For example, according to the Torah law, the blood of an animal is forbidden to eat, but the blood of a fish is permissible. However, according to the principle of marit ayin, it is forbidden to eat the blood of fish as an onlooker may believe the blood being eaten is from an animal, and may thus believe that animal blood is allowed to be eaten.

In private 
There is a disagreement in the Talmud as to whether the concept of marit ayin applies in private. Beit Shamai believes that marit ayin applies even in private, whereas Beit Hillel believes that marit ayin does not apply in private.

Does not always apply 
According to Rabbi Moshe Feinstein in his book Igrot Moshe, marit ayin applies only when "Someone thinks that I violated something, or he thinks that I inappropriately ate something non-kosher. However, it does not include doing something permitted that people may mistakenly think is forbidden due to the fact that they do not know the Jewish law." Therefore, a permitted act which an onlooker might mistake for a different, forbidden act is a case of marit ayin and thus not allowed. However, an act which is allowed, which an onlooker might believe is forbidden, is not a case of marit ayin.

Sepharadim 
According to Maran the Rishon Lezion Chacham Ovadia Yosef zt"l, "marit ayin" applies only when the onlooker may mistakenly interpret the action as something that is an isur d'oraita.  For example, if a person is eating what appears to be a chicken parmesan sandwich, where the cheese is actually vegan cheese (quite common nowadays) made from cashews and the like, the onlooker may mistakenly interpret that the person is eating an actual chicken parmesan sandwich made from dairy cheese. However, since the prohibition of eating chicken and dairy together is an isur d'rabbanan, there is no concern of marit ayin for the person eating such a sandwich. However, if he were eating a meatball sandwich with the same vegan cheese, an onlooker may mistakenly interpret that the person is eating an actual meatball parmesan sandwich made from dairy cheese. Since the prohibition of eating the meat of a cow and dairy together is an isur d'oraita, there is a concern of marit ayin for the person eating such a sandwich.

Judge your fellow favorably 
There is a principle in Judaism called dan l'kaf zechus or judge your fellow favorably. The principle of marit ayin seems to be in contradiction with this principle as if one is performing an action that may look forbidden, it should not be worried that an onlooker will think a forbidden action is being performed as we should judge him favorably that he will judge his fellow individual favorably that he is indeed not performing a wrongful act. However, the truth is that the rabbinic prohibition was not put into place because one may think his fellow man is committing a sin, but rather because he may mistakenly think that the action that he wrongly sees taking place is indeed permissible and thus commits the wrongful action himself in error.

Changes over time 
According to the Shulchan Aruch, if something which was prohibited in the times of the Talmud because of marit ayin is no longer a concern due to modern day circumstances, the prohibition is cancelled. For example, in the times of the Talmud having soy milk, or non-dairy creamer, during the same meal as meat would have been prohibited because it was likely to think that the person was in violation of the laws of kosher. However, since it is well known today that people use non-dairy creamer, there is no issue of marit ayin, and the prohibition is cancelled.

Examples 
Some examples of marit ayin include:

 Eating or drinking kosher food at a non-kosher restaurant
 Killing and eating an animal that is ben pekuah without shechita
 Hanging up wet clothes on Shabbat, since people may think they were washed that day

See also 
 Appearance of impropriety
 optics

References 

Jewish law principles
Jewish philosophical concepts
Hebrew words and phrases in Jewish law